James Anthony Sullivan (born 5 January 1982) is an Australian politician, currently the member for the Queensland Legislative Assembly district of Stafford.

He is the son of Terry Sullivan who also served as the member for Stafford from 2001 to 2006.

References

Living people
1982 births
Members of the Queensland Legislative Assembly
Australian Labor Party members of the Parliament of Queensland
21st-century Australian politicians
Labor Right politicians